Big Eden is a 2000 romantic comedy-drama film written and directed by Thomas Bezucha. Arye Gross stars as Henry Hart, a successful gay artist from New York City who returns to his rural hometown in Montana to care for his ailing grandfather. Henry is welcomed back by the townsfolk, all of whom are aware of his sexuality and are highly accepting and even supportive towards him (the film's plot and dialogue is notably devoid of homophobic content). However, during the months he stays in the town, Henry is forced to confront his unresolved feelings for his high school friend Dean Stewart, while simultaneously being oblivious to the feelings of Pike Dexter (Eric Schweig), the shy Native American owner of the town's general store.

The film won awards from several gay and lesbian film festivals, and was nominated for best limited release film at the GLAAD Media Awards in 2002. Except for the opening sequence, the motion picture was entirely shot in Montana.

Plot
In June 2000, Henry Hart, a gay man, successful artist living in New York, receives a call from his old friend Grace Cornwell, a kindergarten teacher in his hometown, who tells him that his grandfather Sam had a stroke. Although his assistant, Mary Bishop, wants him to stay, Henry feels himself bound to visit and help his ailing grandfather. He jumps on the next plane to his hometown, Big Eden, Montana, giving up his new home and career. Stranded in his place of birth Henry is confronted by the changes of time. Though Sam is becoming better, Henry has the feeling that he should stay with his helpless grandfather because he himself fears becoming an orphan. While accompanying Sam to church every Sunday he involuntarily becomes part of the town life and gossip again. The town-folks somehow always knew about his sexuality, but never mentioned it publicly. Further complicating the situation is the presence of his former high-school crush Dean Stewart, who moved back in town a week earlier. Dean has just split up from his wife and has returned to Big Eden with his kids Ben and Andrew. This leaves Henry trying to work out his unresolved feelings for Dean.

Grace set up a support system for both Henry and Sam. Included is widow Thayer and Pike Dexter, a very shy Native American.  Pike is the town's general-store owner, and the Widow Thayer is center of gossip and society in Big Eden.  She attempts several times to hook up Henry with different people, first women, but after a few "social gatherings" she realizes her error and invites men instead. While all this is going on the Widow Thayer cooks for grandfather and grandson daily, and Pike takes it over to their house and helps by setting the table. After a few weeks Pike realizes that the food is inappropriate and learns how to cook healthy dishes.  He keeps this secret, telling neither the Harts nor Thayer, exchanging Thayer's dinner with his own delicious meals. He also orders the special supplies Henry needs so he can continue painting up in Big Eden. Pike, who wants "things to be nice for Henry", has obviously fallen in love with him too.

Meanwhile, Dean is around Henry a lot, helping him build a ramp for Sam's wheelchair, and taking Henry dancing and to the mountains. With all of his efforts, he tries to show Henry his affection and feelings, but Dean eventually tells Henry that he couldn't live together with him.

Time passes and Sam becomes worse. One night, Henry arrives at home and finds Pike there, looking forlorn. Pike lets Henry know that Sam has died. The town falls into mourning at Sam's death. He built every house in town and was closely connected to each and every one. Though Dean comforts Henry, Pike does the opposite by secluding himself. A funeral is held for Sam, where everyone shows up except for Pike.

Henry, now completely alone, realizes that Pike meant something to him. Pike had shared a "promised dinner together" with him one night where he fascinated Henry by his knowledge of stars and mystical stories. That upsets Henry even more because he thought Sam meant something to Pike too. They both don't talk to each other until the day Henry is leaving for New York. In the very last minute, Pike accepts his love for Henry and tries to catch him at the airport, but he is too late. On his way home, Pike sees Sam's truck in front of his store, not expecting Henry to be waiting for him. The two men become a happy couple.

Cast and roles

Production
The film was shot in Montana, mostly in and near Glacier National Park. The schoolhouse is in West Glacier, and the Big Eden houses are on the shore of Lake McDonald. Pike's general store is a building located in Swan Lake, Montana.

Reception
Big Eden received mixed reviews. On Rotten Tomatoes, it holds a 65% rating based on reviews from 52 critics, with an average rating of 5.92/10. The consensus states: "Though unrealistic, Big Eden has all the charm and sweetness of a fairy tale." On Metacritic, which uses an average of critics' reviews, the film has a score of 59 out of 100 based on reviews from 19 critics, indicating "mixed or average reviews".

David Ehrenstein from New Times LA wrote "Has all the crowd-pleasing elements moviegoers respond to: appealing hero, absorbing story, a solid group of supporting players and a big fat happy ending." Elizabeth Weitzman from New York Daily News commented "Director Bezucha's eyes are as starry as Montana's sky, but it's pretty hard to resist such a determinedly utopian vision of love." Carla Meyer from San Francisco Chronicle wrote "It's unlikely that the whole cowboy town would really applaud all the queer goings-on, but it's a lovely sentiment in a lovely movie."

Awards
The film received awards and nominations from a number of independent film festivals, including a nomination for best limited release film at the GLAAD Media Awards in 2002.
 2000 L.A. Outfest: Audience Award - Outstanding Narrative Feature; Grand Jury Award - Outstanding Actor in a Feature Film: Eric Schweig
 2000 San Francisco International Lesbian & Gay Film Festival: Audience Award - Best Feature
 2000 Seattle Lesbian & Gay Film Festival: Audience Award - Favorite Narrative Feature
 2000 Cleveland International Film Festival: Best American Independent Feature Film; Best Film 	
 2001 Florida Film Festival: Audience Award - Best Narrative Feature
 2001 Miami Gay and Lesbian Film Festival: Jury Award - Best Fiction Feature
 2001 Toronto Inside Out Lesbian and Gay Film and Video Festival: Audience Award - Best Feature Film or Video

Soundtrack
The film combines both classic and contemporary country songs, though there was no commercially released soundtrack. Tracks featured in the film are:

In addition to these tracks that are or were commercially available, the film features two performances by a group called Railroad Earth. Actress Louise Fletcher also performs 'Take Me in Your Arms and Hold Me' which was originally recorded by Eddy Arnold in 1949. Fletcher also sings the contemporary mourning ballad, Linger in Blissful Repose at Sam's funeral. The film's original score was composed by Joseph Conlan.

References

External links
 
 
 

2000 films
2000 directorial debut films
2000 independent films
2000 LGBT-related films
2000 romantic comedy-drama films
2001 LGBT-related films
2001 films
American independent films
American LGBT-related films
American romantic comedy-drama films
2000s English-language films
Films about interracial romance
Films about Native Americans
Films directed by Thomas Bezucha
Films set in Montana
Films shot in Montana
Films with screenplays by Thomas Bezucha
Gay-related films
2000s American films
LGBT-related romantic comedy-drama films